Darreh Ney-ye Olya (also Romanized as Darreh Ney-ye ‘Olyā and Darreh Ney-e ‘Olyā; also known as Darreh Ney-ye Bālā) is a village in Tashan-e Gharbi Rural District, Tashan District, Behbahan County, Khuzestan Province, Iran. At the 2006 census, its population was 105, in 13 families.

References 

Populated places in Behbahan County